Larry Kentera is a former American football coach and player. He served as the head football coach at Northern Arizona University from 1985 to 1989, compiling a record of 26–29. He spent many years as a defensive assistant at his alma mater, Arizona State University, under head coach Frank Kush.

Head coaching record

College

References

Year of birth missing (living people)
Living people
Arizona State Sun Devils football coaches
Arizona State Sun Devils football players
Northern Arizona Lumberjacks football coaches